Adrià Puntí (Salt, Catalonia, born 13 June 1963) is a musician, singer-songwriter and actor. Currently he is singing under his real name "Josep Puntí".

Discography 
With Umpah-pah:
 Tomahawk (1990) (Maqueta)
 Raons de Pes (1991)
 Bamboo Avenue (1992)
 Bordell (1994)
 Triquiñuelas al óleo (1994)
 La Columna de Simeón (1996)

As Adrià Puntí:
 Pepalallarga i... (1997). Picap
 L'hora del pati (1999). Picap
 Maria (2002). Picap
 La clau de girar el taller (2015). Satelitek

References

External links
 http://www.adriapunti.com
 Biografia i discografia comentada d'Adrià Puntí. (in Catalan)
 Redescobrint l'Artista, un bloc molt ben documentat (in Catalan)
 http://www.myspace.com/josep.punti
 https://www.facebook.com/j.punti
 https://twitter.com/AdriaPunti
 http://www.viasona.cat/grup/adria-punti (in Catalan)

1963 births
Living people
People from Gironès
Singers from Catalonia
Singer-songwriters from Catalonia
Catalan-language singers
Música Global artists